Robert Voloder (born 9 May 2001) is a German professional footballer who plays as a defender for Major League Soccer club Sporting Kansas City.

Club career
In May 2020, Voloder signed his first professional contract with 1. FC Köln that would keep him at the club until 2023. In June 2021, he was sent on loan to Slovenian PrvaLiga side Maribor. On 18 July 2021, Voloder made his professional debut in a PrvaLiga match against Celje. He featured in all 20 league matches in the first half of the season, before Maribor activated the possibility of making the transfer permanent in December 2021.

On 19 January 2022, Voloder signed a three-year contract with Major League Soccer side Sporting Kansas City, with an option for another year.

Notes

References

External links

2001 births
Living people
Footballers from Frankfurt
German footballers
Citizens of Bosnia and Herzegovina through descent
Bosnia and Herzegovina footballers
Association football defenders
Bosnia and Herzegovina youth international footballers
Germany youth international footballers
1. FC Köln II players
1. FC Köln players
NK Maribor players
Sporting Kansas City players
Regionalliga players
Slovenian PrvaLiga players
Major League Soccer players
German expatriate footballers
Bosnia and Herzegovina expatriate footballers
German expatriate sportspeople in Slovenia
Bosnia and Herzegovina expatriate sportspeople in Slovenia
Expatriate footballers in Slovenia
German expatriate sportspeople in the United States
Bosnia and Herzegovina expatriate sportspeople in the United States
Expatriate soccer players in the United States
German people of Croatian descent
German people of Bosnia and Herzegovina descent